A Letter for Evie is a 1946 American comedy film directed by Jules Dassin.

Plot
New York city girl Evie O'Connor works as a secretary for the Trojan Shirt Co. in Brooklyn. She has her mind set on finding a tall, strong man to marry - one that can wear a Trojan shirt with a 16 1/2 neck size.

She writes a short letter and puts it in a shirt that is to be sent to an army camp. The shirt eventually ends up on private Edgar "Wolf" Larsen, who has quite a reputation as a ladies' man. Wolf reads the letter aloud to his bunk mate John Phoneas McPherson, then throws it away. John picks it up again and gets interested in finding the woman behind the letter. Although John is not big and strong like Wolf, but short and small, he decides to pursue Evie by writing her back.

John and Evie become pen pals, but he sends her a picture of Wolf when she asks for a picture of him, since he is afraid she will lose interest if he admits to not being of the same size and dimension.

Some time later John's unit passes through New York, and he goes to see her, posing as his own friend Wolf. When he sees her he is smitten at the first glance. The two get along wonderfully, having a lot of the same interests, but he is afraid that if she discovers his deception she will hate him, so he continues to pretend being someone else. Wolf finds out about the correspondence between him and Evie, and makes a surprise visit at Evie's place when John is there. Wolf takes her in his arms and kisses her, pretending to be the one who wrote the letters. Evie is at first madly in love with him, but feels some chemistry missing that she felt when he wrote the letters. He explains to her that he can only be eloquent when writing, but not when speaking.

A commotion occurs as John tries to stop Evie and Wolf from being alone with each other, and at the same time fending off Evie's roommate Barney Lee, who is attracted to him. He eventually pretends to be drunk and forces Wolf and Evie apart.

Jealous, John strikes Wolf outside Evie's apartment and tells him to stay away from "his" girl. Wolf ignores John's command and meets Evie again in secret. John finds out about their meetings when Wolf answers her phone call.

John rushes to Evie's apartment building and starts a fire to smoke the couple out. In the ensuing commotion, Wolf trips and falls, hurting his head. Subsequently, when not in his right mind, Wolf asks Evie to marry him. She accepts, but the marriage is postponed, since the unit is shipped overseas the next morning. While away on his mission Wolf meets and marries a French girl, placing the burden on John of telling Evie about the deception.

Evie, not receiving any letters from John for several months and becoming worried, goes to visit John's family in New York. While there, she discovers by looking through a photo album that the man whose home she is visiting, and who wrote her the letters, is the short small one, and not the tall strong one. She is heartbroken, and back home she cries to her roommate that she never wants to see either man again. She also confesses to being confused as to which man she had really loved: the one who kissed her, or the one who wrote the letters.

Meantime John, who doesn't know that Evie knows, is trying to figure out how to break the news to her. Just released from the army hospital with a wounded leg, he decides to protect both Wolf's honor and Evie's faith by telling her that John is dead, and that he died loving her. He gives Evie the gift of his purple heart. Evie then realizes that all along it was this man who had loved her, and this man whom she had fallen in love with. She is delighted, and they unite in a kiss.

The story is a spinoff of Cyrano de Bergerac, updated to a modern setting.

Cast
 Marsha Hunt as Evie O'Connor
 John Carroll as Edgar 'Wolf' Larson
 Hume Cronyn as John Phineas McPherson
 Spring Byington as Mrs. McPherson
 Pamela Britton as Barney Lee
 Norman Lloyd as DeWitt Pynchon
 Percival Vivian as Mr. McPherson
 Donald Curtis as Capt. Budlowe
 Esther Howard as Mrs. Edgewaters
 Robin Raymond as Eloise Edgewaters

References

External links

1946 films
1946 comedy-drama films
American comedy-drama films
American black-and-white films
Films directed by Jules Dassin
Metro-Goldwyn-Mayer films
1940s American films